Miracle on 34th Street is a popular 1947 film with Natalie Wood and Edmund Gwenn.

Miracle on 34th Street may also refer to:

Miracle on 34th Street (novella) by Valentine Davies, published in conjunction with the release of the 1947 film
The Miracle on 34th Street (The 20th Century Fox Hour), 1955 filmed television adaptation with Thomas Mitchell
Miracle on 34th Street (NBC Friday Night Special Presentation), 1959 live color television adaptation with Ed Wynn
Miracle on 34th Street (1973 film), television movie remake with Sebastian Cabot
Miracle on 34th Street (1994 film), feature film remake with Richard Attenborough
Miracle on 34th Street (Baltimore), a holiday light display

See also
 34th Street (disambiguation)